The 2008 Leeds City Council election took place on Thursday 1 May 2008 to elect members of Leeds City Council in England.

As per the election cycle, one third of the council's 99 seats were contested, plus an additional vacancy in Calverley and Farsley ward as Amanda Carter stood down. Those seats up for election were those of the first-placed candidate elected for every ward at the 2004 all-out election, who had been granted a four-year term to expire in 2008.

It saw the Liberal Democrat and Conservative coalition administration continue their control of the council. Despite both Labour and the Liberal Democrats winning more seats, the Conservatives won the majority of votes cast for the first time since 1992.

The Liberal Democrats regained a total of 24 seats on the council by defeating former Liberal Democrat-turn-independent and then Conservative councillor for Weetwood ward, Brian Jennings. This had followed Hyde Park and Woodhouse councillor, Kabeer Hussain, defecting from the Liberal Democrats to Labour in October 2007, who he then left less than six months later to sit as an Independent before the 2008 election.

Election result

This result had the following consequences for the total number of seats on the council after the elections:

Councillors who did not stand for re-election

Incumbent Labour councillor, Sharon Hamilton (Chapel Allerton), was selected as her party's candidate for Roundhay ward and lost to the Conservative incumbent. Hamilton was later elected for Moortown in 2010.

Ward results

By-elections between 2008 and 2010

Notes

References

2008 English local elections
2008
2000s in Leeds